Derek Anthony Oatway (10 January 1931 – 15 January 2003) was a Bermudian swimmer. He competed in four events at the 1948 Summer Olympics.

References

1931 births
2003 deaths
Bermudian male swimmers
Olympic swimmers of Bermuda
Swimmers at the 1948 Summer Olympics
People from Pembroke Parish